The 2021–22 Dutch Basketball Cup was the 54th edition of the Netherlands' national basketball cup tournament. The final was played on 20 March 2022 in the MartiniPlaza, Groningen. Donar defeated Heroes Den Bosch to win its tied-record 7th cup title.

Bracket

Eightfinals
The draw for the eightfinals was held on 26 November 2021. The eightfinals began on 11 December 2021 and ended on 18 December 2021.

Final

See also
2021–22 BNXT League

References

2021–22
Cup